The Royal Philharmonic Society (RPS) is a British music society, formed in 1813.  Its original purpose was to promote performances of instrumental music in London.  Many composers and performers have taken part in its concerts.  It is now a membership society, and while it no longer has its own orchestra, it continues a wide-ranging programme of activities which focus on composers and young musicians and aim to engage audiences so that future generations will enjoy a rich and vibrant musical life. Since 1989, the RPS has promoted the annual Royal Philharmonic Society Music Awards for live music-making in the United Kingdom. 

The RPS is a registered UK charity No. 213693, located at 48 Great Marlborough Street in London. The current chief executive of the RPS is James Murphy, and its current chairman is John Gilhooly.

History 
In London, at a time when there were no permanent London orchestras, nor organised series of chamber music concerts, a group of thirty music professionals formed the Philharmonic Society of London on 6 February 1813. The idea was that by cooperating, they could build a stronger orchestra than by competing against one another. However, given the organization's choice to hold its concerts at the Argyll Rooms, it is likely that the society was initiated because of John Nash's bold urban redesign of Regent Street. In this way, the society would gain an impressive performing space once the old Argyll Rooms had to be rebuilt due to the Regent Street plan, and Prince regent George IV could promote classical music as a British institution and thereby improve his reputation. Concerts were held in the Argyll Rooms until it burned down in 1830.

The Society's aim was "to promote the performance, in the most perfect manner possible of the best and most approved instrumental music". The first concert, on 8 March 1813, was presided over by Johann Peter Salomon, with Muzio Clementi at the piano and the violin prodigy Nicolas Mori as lead violinist, performing symphonies by Joseph Haydn and Ludwig van Beethoven. Among the founders were the pianist and violinist William Dance (who became the society's first director and treasurer until his death in 1840), composer Henry Bishop, and Charles Neate, a pianist and friend of Beethoven, who publicised Beethoven's music at the Society.

The Society asked Beethoven to come to London, but the composer's health prevented his accepting the invitation. However the society's request for a new symphony from him resulted in the Choral Symphony. In 1827 Beethoven wrote to the society outlining his straitened circumstances; at a special general meeting the society resolved to send the composer £100 immediately (George Bernard Shaw once referred to this as "the only entirely creditable incident in English history"). Other works written for the Society include the Italian Symphony by Felix Mendelssohn. Distinguished conductors included Ludwig Spohr, one of the first conductors to use a baton, Hector Berlioz, who conducted a concert of his works in 1853, Richard Wagner, who conducted the whole 1855 season of orchestral concerts, William Sterndale Bennett for the following ten years, Arthur Sullivan, and Tchaikovsky, who conducted his own works in 1888 and 1893.

From 1830 to 1869, the Society gave its concerts in the concert-hall of Hanover Square Rooms, which had seating for only about 800.  The Society decided to move permanently to St James's Hall, and a complimentary additional concert, held at the hall, was given to its subscribers at the end of the 1868–69 season. Charles Santley, Charles Hallé, Thérèse Tietjens and Christina Nilsson were the soloists. When the move was made, the Society remodelled its charges to obtain a wider audience and compete with the Crystal Palace and other large venues, and introduced annotated programmes. The Society remained at the hall until 28 February 1894, when it moved to the Queen's Hall.

The society became the Royal Philharmonic Society during its 100th concert season in 1912, and continued organising concerts through the two world wars. It is now a membership society which "seeks to create a future for music through the encouragement of creativity, the recognition of excellence and the promotion of understanding."

 See Works commissioned by the RPS for a list of works commissioned by or dedicated to the Royal Philharmonic Society.

The Gold Medal 
The Gold Medal was first awarded in 1871.  The medal depicts the profile of a bust of Beethoven by Johann Nepomuk Schaller (1777–1842) which was presented to the society in 1870, Beethoven's centenary.  It is awarded for "outstanding musicianship", and is given rarely – in 2015 the medal was awarded for the hundredth time.

Recipients 

 1871
 Sir William Sterndale Bennett
 Christina Nilsson
 Charles Gounod
 Joseph Joachim
 Helen Lemmens-Sherrington
 Arabella Goddard
 Sir Charles Santley
 William Cusins
 Thérèse Tietjens
 Felix Janiewicz
 Fanny Linzbauer (the donor of the bust of Beethoven)
 1872
 Euphrosyne Parepa-Rosa
 1873
 Hans von Bülow
 1876
 Louisa Bodda-Pyne
 Anton Rubinstein
 1877
 Johannes Brahms
 1880
 Stanley Lucas
 1895
 Adelina Patti
 1897
 Dame Emma Albani
 Ignacy Jan Paderewski
 1900
 Edward Lloyd
 1901
 Eugène Ysaÿe
 1902
 Jan Kubelík
 1903
 Dame Clara Butt
 1904
 Fritz Kreisler
 1909
 Louise Kirkby Lunn
 1910
 Emil von Sauer
 1912
 Pablo Casals
 Harold Bauer
 Luisa Tetrazzini
 1914
 Muriel Foster
 1916
 Vladimir de Pachmann
 1921
 Sir Henry Wood
 1922
 Sir Alexander Mackenzie
 1932 (??)
 Alfred Cortot
 1925
 Frederick Delius
 Sir Edward Elgar
 1928
 Sir Thomas Beecham
 1930
 Ralph Vaughan Williams
 Gustav Holst
 1931
 Arnold Bax
 1932
 Sergei Rachmaninoff
 1934
 Sir Edward German
 Sir Hamilton Harty
 1935
 Jean Sibelius
 1936
 Richard Strauss
 1937
 Felix Weingartner
 Arturo Toscanini
 1942
 Dame Myra Hess
 1944
 Sergei Prokofiev
 Sir Adrian Boult
 1947
 Sir William Walton
 1950
 Sir John Barbirolli
 1953
 Kathleen Ferrier
 1954
 Igor Stravinsky
 1957
 Bruno Walter
 1959
 Sir Malcolm Sargent
 1961
 Arthur Rubinstein
 1962
 Yehudi Menuhin
 1963
 Sir Arthur Bliss
 Pierre Monteux
 1964
 Lionel Tertis
 Benjamin Britten
 1966
 Dmitri Shostakovich
 1967
 Zoltán Kodály
 1970
 Mstislav Rostropovich
 1974
 Vladimir Horowitz
 1975
 Olivier Messiaen
 1976
 Sir Michael Tippett
 1980
 Sir Clifford Curzon
 1984
 Herbert von Karajan
 1986
 Andrés Segovia
 Witold Lutosławski
 1987
 Leonard Bernstein
 1988
 Dietrich Fischer-Dieskau
 1989
 Sir Georg Solti
 1990
 Claudio Arrau
 Janet Baker
 Bernard Haitink
 Sviatoslav Richter
 1991
 Isaac Stern
 1992
 Alfred Brendel
 1994
 Sir Colin Davis
 1995
 Elliott Carter
 Rafael Kubelík
 1997
 Pierre Boulez
 1999
 Sir Simon Rattle
 Plácido Domingo
 2002
 Dame Joan Sutherland
 2003
 Claudio Abbado
 2004
 György Ligeti
 2005
 Sir Charles Mackerras
 2007
 Daniel Barenboim
 2008
 Henri Dutilleux
 2009
 Thomas Quasthoff
 2012
 Nikolaus Harnoncourt
 Dame Mitsuko Uchida
 2013
 Sir András Schiff
 György Kurtág
 2014
 Sir John Tomlinson
 2015
 Sir Antonio Pappano
 Martha Argerich
 2016
 Sir Peter Maxwell Davies
 2017
 Charles Dutoit
 Mariss Jansons
 2018
 Jessye Norman
 2019
 Sofia Gubaidulina
 2020
 John Williams
 2021
 Vladimir Jurowski

Honorary membership 
Through awarding honorary membership the society recognises "services to music".  Like the Gold Medal, honorary membership is awarded rarely; first awarded in 1826, by 2006 only 117 honorary members had been created.

Honorary members 

 1826
 Carl Maria von Weber
 1829
 Daniel Auber
 Jean-François Le Sueur
 Felix Mendelssohn
 Giacomo Meyerbeer
 George Onslow
 1830
 Johann Nepomuk Hummel
 1836
 Sigismond Thalberg
 1839
 Gioachino Rossini
 1859
 Hector Berlioz
 Niels Gade
 Fromental Halévy
 Moritz Hauptmann
 Ferdinand Hiller
 Franz Liszt
 Heinrich Marschner
 Ignaz Moscheles
 Julius Rietz
 Johannes Verhulst
 1860
 Richard Wagner
 1861
 Euphrosyne Parepa-Rosa
 1869
 Lucy Anderson
 1869
 Otto Goldschmidt
 Charles Gounod
 Stephen Heller
 Thérèse Tietjens
 1870
 Joseph Joachim
 1882
 Johannes Brahms
 Joachim Raff
 Alberto Randegger
 Giuseppe Verdi
 1884
 Antonín Dvořák
 Sophie Menter
 Wassily Sapellnikoff
 Pablo de Sarasate
 1885
 Giovanni Bottesini
 Hans von Bülow
 1886
 Franz Rummel
 1887
 Moritz Moszkowski
 Camille Saint-Saëns
 Clara Schumann
 1888
 Johan Svendsen
 1889
 Edvard Grieg
 Pyotr Ilyich Tchaikovsky
 Charles-Marie Widor
 1891
 František Ondříček
 Eugène Ysaÿe
 1893
 Ignacy Jan Paderewski
 1894
 Max Bruch
 1897
 Emil von Sauer
 Alexander Glazunov
 1899
 Moriz Rosenthal
 1902
 Sergei Rachmaninoff
 Jules Massenet
 1906
 Raoul Pugno
 Hans Richter
 Richard Strauss
 1908
 Jan Kubelík
 1912
 Vasily Safonov
 1913
 Willem Mengelberg
 Arthur Nikisch
 1921
 Alfred Cortot
 Maurice Ravel
 Igor Stravinsky
 Arturo Toscanini
 1922
 Harold Bauer
 1927
 Leopold Stokowski
 1929
 Jean Sibelius
 1930
 Pablo Casals
 1948
 Keith Douglas (Hon. Sec. of the Society)
 John Mewburn Levien
 1951
 Frederic Austin
 Ernest Irving
 1953
 Marion Scott
 Albert Schweitzer
 1959
 Arthur Rubinstein
 1956
 Paul Hindemith
 Gregor Piatigorsky
 1959
 Benno Moiseiwitsch
 1960
 George Baker
 1970
 Aaron Copland
 1971
 William Glock
 1984
 Eric Fenby
 1985
 Lennox Berkeley
 Dietrich Fischer-Dieskau
 Yehudi Menuhin
 Gerald Moore
 Solomon
 1986
 Lorin Maazel
 1987
 Dame Janet Baker
 Peter Maxwell Davies
 Léon Goossens
 1988
 Claudio Arrau
 Julian Bream
 Bernard Haitink
 1989
 John Denison
 Vernon Handley
 1990
 Sir Charles Groves
 Rafael Kubelík
 1991
 Thomas Armstrong
 Harrison Birtwistle
 Pierre Boulez
 Elliott Carter
 Joan Cross
 György Ligeti
 Paul Sacher
 Katharine, Duchess of Kent
 1994
 Felix Aprahamian
 Sir Charles Mackerras
 1996
 Howard Ferguson
 1997
 John Gardner
 1998
 George Lascelles, 7th Earl of Harewood
 Sir George Christie
 1999
 Sir David Willcocks
 Richard Steinitz
 Philip Jones
 Anthony Payne
 2001
 Evelyn Barbirolli
 2002
 Oliver Knussen
 2004
 Richard McNicol
 2006
 Michael Kennedy
 2007
 David Lloyd-Jones
 2008
 José Antonio Abreu
 2009
 Brian McMaster
 2010
 Graham Johnson
 Fanny Waterman
 2011
 George Benjamin
 Tony Fell
 Mark Elder
 2012
 John Stephens
 2013
 Ricardo Castro (Bahia, Brazil)
 Armand Diangienda (Kinshasa, DRC)
 Aaron Dworkin (USA)
 Rosemary Nalden (Soweto, SA)
 Ahmad Sarmast (Kabul, Afghanistan)
 2014
 Martin Campbell-White (artist manager)
 Marin Alsop
 2015
 Evelyn Glennie
 2016
 Graham Vick
 2017
 Barrie Gavin
 2018
 Stephen Hough
 2019
 Stephen Sondheim
 Alexander Goehr
 David Pountney
 2022
 Jordi Savall

See also 
 New Philharmonic Society

References

External links 
 The Royal Philharmonic Society
 Royal Philharmonic Society Gold Medal
 British Library: Royal Philharmonic Society Archive

 
1813 establishments in the United Kingdom
Classical music in the United Kingdom 
Charities based in London
Organizations established in 1813
Arts organizations established in the 1810s